Khoruzhivka is a village located in Sumy Oblast in northern Ukraine. It lies 111 meters (367 ft) above sea level. Viktor Yushchenko, the third President of Ukraine and opposition candidate in the 2004 Ukrainian presidential election, was born there, as was the composer Thomas de Hartmann.

Romensky Uyezd

Villages in Romny Raion